The United States Climate Alliance is a bipartisan coalition of states and unincorporated self-governing territories in the United States that are committed to upholding the objectives of the 2015 Paris Agreement on climate change within their borders, by achieving the U.S. goal of reducing greenhouse gas (carbon dioxide equivalent) economy-wide emissions 26–28% from 2005 levels by 2025 and meeting or exceeding the targets of the federal Clean Power Plan.

The Alliance was formed on June 1, 2017, following the announcement earlier that day by U.S. President Donald Trump that he had decided to withdraw the United States from the Paris Agreement. The Alliance also forms a forum for its members to further develop and strengthen their existing Climate Action Plans, through sharing of information and best practices.

As of July 1, 2019, the 23 members of the Alliance at the time made up 50% of the U.S. population and over 50% of U.S. GDP . After excluding Puerto Rico figures from the emission total, the members' combined share of U.S. carbon dioxide emissions was 25.51% in 2014.

History
Prior the founding of the alliance, 12 states led by Democratic governors signed a petition urging the president of the United States to stay in the Paris Agreement on May 3. A similar petition was signed by 2 states led by Republican governors on May 17.

The Alliance was formed on June 1, 2017, following the announcement earlier that day by U.S. President Donald Trump that he had decided to withdraw the United States from the Paris Agreement. The formation of the Alliance was announced by three state governors: Jay Inslee of Washington, Andrew Cuomo of New York, and Jerry Brown of California. The Alliance is not a legally binding treaty, but a grouping of state governments with similar policies regarding climate change.

The founding press statement was released in three versions on June 1, which all stated that: "New York, California and Washington, representing over one-fifth of U.S. Gross Domestic Product, are committed to achieving the U.S. goal of reducing emissions 26–28 percent from 2005 levels and meeting or exceeding the targets of the federal Clean Power Plan." The governors of the three founding states are members of the Democratic Party, although the alliance itself is founded as a bipartisan coalition also open for membership of states governed by members of the Republican Party.

By the evening of June 1, the state governors of seven other U.S. states (Connecticut, Hawaii, Oregon, Massachusetts, Rhode Island, Vermont and Virginia) announced their intention to maintain their states' support for the Paris Agreement, though not necessarily as part of the Alliance. All those seven states expressing Paris agreement support on June 1, opted to become members of the Alliance within the next four days. Nearly 70% of Americans, including a majority of people in all 50 states, support the Paris Agreement on climate change.

On June 2, Governor Dan Malloy announced that Connecticut would join the Alliance. On the same day, Massachusetts Governor Charlie Baker became the first Republican governor to bring his state into the Alliance. Governor Phil Scott of Vermont, another Republican, said his state would join. Governor Gina Raimondo said Rhode Island would also join. Governor Kate Brown said Oregon would join. Governor David Ige of Hawaii announced that Hawaii would also join, making them the 9th state in the Alliance.

On June 5, Democratic Virginia Governor Terry McAuliffe announced that Virginia would join the Alliance. Governor Mark Dayton of Minnesota, Governor John Carney of Delaware, and Governor Ricardo Rosselló of Puerto Rico joined the Alliance on June 5. On July 11, Colorado Governor John Hickenlooper announced that Colorado would join the Alliance, bringing the total number of members to 14 (thirteen states and Puerto Rico.)

On July 13, the alliance's official website was launched. As of the launch of the website, the members of the alliance comprised 13 out of the 14 states having signed a petition urging the president of the United States to stay in the Paris Agreement in May 2017 (only Pennsylvania had opted not to join).

On September 20, North Carolina governor Roy Cooper announced that his state would join the Alliance, bringing the total number of state members to 14. On January 10, 2018, Maryland governor Larry Hogan made his state the third Republican-led state to join the Alliance, bringing the total number of state members to 15. On February 21, 2018, newly elected New Jersey governor Phil Murphy announced that his state was joining the Alliance, bringing the total number of state members to 16.

In January 2019, Governors J. B. Pritzker of Illinois and Michelle Lujan Grisham of New Mexico announced that their states would join the Alliance, bringing the total number of state members to 18.

In February 2019, Governors Gretchen Whitmer of Michigan, Tony Evers of Wisconsin and Janet Mills of Maine announced that their states would join the Alliance, bringing the total number of state members to 21.

In March 2019, Governor Steve Sisolak of Nevada announced that his state would join the Alliance, bringing the total number of state members to 22. In April 2019, Governor Tom Wolf of Pennsylvania announced that his state would join the Alliance as well, bringing the total number of state members to 23. In July 2019, Governor Steve Bullock of Montana announced that his state would join the Alliance, bringing the total number of state members to 24.

Membership

See also
 Under2 MOU
 Mayors National Climate Action Agenda
 Climate change in the United States

References

Climate change policy in the United States
Jay Inslee
Gavin Newsom
United States interstate compacts